Świny Castle (Polish: Zamek Świny; formerly Schweinhausburg in German) - formerly a gord, as a stronghold existed in its location already in the fifth century - securing the Lubawecki mountain pass, the site was recorded in Cosmas' documents from 1108, where the gord is recorded as Suini in Poloniae. Possibly, soon after, the gord had been expanded into a military stronghold, at which time it was the seat of the castellans. The castle was mentioned in Pope Adrian IV's Papal bull. After the Bolków Castle was constructed, the castle began to lose its significance, this continued up to the nineteenth century, when the castle suffered severe damage due to hurricanes (1762, 1840, 1848, and 1868). The castle suffered further devastation - it was not until 1931 when the authorities had engaged in securing the castle's ruins. Currently the castle is privately owned.

External links 

  Zamek Świny - Schweinhausburg na portalu polska-org.pl

References

Castles in Lower Silesian Voivodeship
Jawor County